Retrograss is a bluegrass album by David Grisman, John Hartford and Mike Seeger.  It was released on the Acoustic Disc record label in 1999. Retrograss received a Grammy nomination in the Traditional Folk Album category in 2000.

Reception

Writing for Allmusic, critic Brian Kelly wrote "All in all, these live, in-studio recordings are mirthful, rocking chair adaptations of American music history. Seeger and Grisman's honeyed tenors conflict well with Hartford's quirky baritone. There are no breakneck solos, and the whole effort achieves more than the sum of its parts..."

Kevin Oliver of Country Standard Time wrote the "more radical reworkings are balanced out by some less revolutionary, but still intriguing versions of bluegrass tunes - Earl Scruggs, "Flint Hill Special," Jimmy Martin's "My Walking Shoes" and the omnipresent classic, "Uncle Pen." With these more traditional tunes included, what could have been a mere novelty record becomes a fascinating study in the mutability of musical genres from another era."

Track listing
 "My Walking Shoes" (Jimmy Martin) – 2:49
 "Hound Dawg" (Jerry Leiber, Mike Stoller) – 2:39
 "Maggie's Farm" (Bob Dylan) – 2:48
 "Memphis" (Chuck Berry) – 2:44
 "Flint Hill Special" (Earl Scruggs) – 2:32
 "The Old Home Place" (Mitch Jayne, Dean Webb) – 3:02
 "Uncle Pen" (Bill Monroe) – 3:02
 "Air Mail Special on the Fly" (Godson, Rusk) – 2:14
 "Rocky Top" (Boudleaux Bryant, Felice Bryant) – 3:30
 "Room at the Stop of the Stair" (Randall Hylton) – 2:14
 "(Sittin' On) The Dock of the Bay" (Steve Cropper, Otis Redding) – 2:38
 "Jerusalem Ridge" (Monroe) – 3:39
 "Windy Mountain" (Curley Ray Cline) – 3:07
 "Maybellene" (Berry) – 2:40
 "Blue Ridge Cabin Home" (Louise Certain, Gladys Stacey) – 3:16
 "Rocky Road Blues" (Monroe) – 3:42
 "When I'm Sixty-Four" (John Lennon, Paul McCartney) – 7:51

Personnel
David Grisman – banjo, bass, guitar, mandolin, vocals, tenor ukulele
John Hartford – banjo, fiddle, guitar, autoharp, vocals, 5-string banjo
Mike Seeger – banjo, fiddle, guitar, harmonica, mandolin, autoharp, Jew's harp, vocals
Sam Grisman – double bass

Production notes
Craig Miller – executive producer
David Dennison – engineer, mixing
Paul Stubblebine – mastering
D. Brent Hauseman – design, photography
Dave Kiphuth – illustrations, drawing
Andrew Day – photography
Clarke Prouty – photography

References

Acoustic Disc albums
David Grisman albums
John Hartford albums
1999 albums